Barlinnie Nine is a single-movement orchestral composition by the Finnish composer Osmo Tapio Räihälä.  The work was premiered by the Finnish Radio Symphony Orchestra under the conductor Sakari Oramo on 20 April 2005 at Finlandia Hall.

Composition
Barlinnie Nine has a duration of roughly 11 and half minutes and is composed in one continuous movement.  The work has a subtitle A Tribute to Duncan Ferguson. Räihälä has described the work as a symphonic poem, and as a "musical portrait" of the Scottish footballer Duncan Ferguson.

Instrumentation
The work is scored for three flutes (doubling piccolo and tin whistles), three oboes (doubling cor anglais), three clarinets (doubling bass clarinet), three bassoons (doubling contrabassoon), four French horns, three trumpets, three trombones, tuba, timpani, two percussionists, harp, and strings.

The title

According to Räihälä, the title refers to HMP Barlinnie, where Ferguson served his prison sentence in 1995, and to Ferguson's shirt number in Everton.

The Ferguson goal co-incidence
In the same evening when Barlinnie Nine was premiered in Helsinki, Duncan Ferguson returned to the Everton side, that was chasing a spot in the Champions League, for a game versus Manchester United. Ferguson had been out of the side for most of the season, but headed the only goal of the game, giving Everton their first win over Manchester United for ten years. As it happens, the previous victory was also at Goodison Park, and even then Ferguson was the scorer of the only goal of the game, a header at the same end of the pitch. However, at this time Räihälä, a lifelong Everton supporter, had stopped following football, and was unaware of the game. After having learned about this co-incidence, Räihälä stated:

Recording
The live performance of Barlinnie Nine was released on Räihälä's profile album Peat, Smoke & Seaweed Storm in 2014. The score is published by Sikorski publishing house.

References

Compositions by Osmo Tapio Räihälä
2005 compositions
Symphonic poems